The Achada Plateau is an extensive volcanic mountain range located on Pico Island, Azores. It is a protected area with many valuable features that characterize the Azorean landscape. It is included in two Natura 2000 sites, one of which is classified as an Important Bird Area. Part of the plateau also includes a ramsar wetland. It is one of the three main geomorphological units that comprise Pico Island.

Location and geomorphology

The Achada Plateau is located on the highlands of Pico, the highest and second largest island on the archipelago of the Azores. It is characterized by the steep slopes that limit it to the south and north and by the presence in the axial zone of the range of various volcano-tectonic alignments of cinder and spatter cones and eruptive fissures (typical of a basaltic fissural volcanism).

The volcanic cones, totaling around 190, have very varied dimensions and shapes, usually with associated ʻaʻā-type drains, which flowed towards the coast. Some cones show craters (sometimes occupied by small ponds) that are multiple, elongated or have several eruptive mouths, which reflect the associated tectonics.

Biome

The Achada Plateau is one of the most valuable natural sites on the Azores. It hosts one of the last intact remnants of the original temperate mixed forests that covered the archipelago before the arrival of humans and the following deforestation and introduction of exotic species. It is listed as an Important Bird Area, several birds species make home in the peat bogs, ponds and lakes of the formation.

Part of the central plateau was designated a Ramsar wetland in 2008 due to its ecological importance. Bodies of water include: Lagoa dos Grotões, Lagoa da Rosada, Lagoa do Paul, Lagoa do Landroal, Lagoa do Caiado, Lagoa do Peixinho and Lagoa Negra.

The plateau is part of two Natura 2000 sites: The Special Conservation Zone of Mount Pico, Prainha and Caveiro; and the Special Protection Zone of the Central Zone of Pico.

Climate

Due to its altitude, the plateau has a significantly different climate when compared to the rest of the island. According to Köppen, Achada has an oceanic climate, with cool to warm summers and chilly to mild winters.

The area is subject to intense orographic lift which makes precipitation thoroughly abundant, humidity high (around 90%) and cloudiness persistent. There is a noticeably drier season in the summer, influence of its proximity to the Mediterranean Basin.

Flora

The plateau is characterized by two types of landscapes:

Pasture, used by cattle and characterized by the lack of woody plants and a predominance of native grasses and peat moss.
Native laurisilva cloud forests with many Azorean endemics such as Juniperus brevifolia, Erica azorica, Viburnum treleasei, Euphorbia stygiana, Vaccinium cylindraceum, Laurus azorica, Ilex perado, among others.

Birds
The plateau is also an important area for many resident and migratory bird species, especially the Azores wood pigeon. Most commonly found are the Azores chaffinch, the common snipe, the Eurasian teal, the American wigeon, the ring-necked duck, the mallard, the American black duck, the snow bunting, the grey heron, the grey wagtail, the common buzzard, the Atlantic gull, the wagtails and the Eurasian woodcock. Less frequent specimens include the Western Azores goldcrest, the Eurasian wigeon, the Eurasian blackcap, the European robin, the Azores blackbird, and the Atlantic canary. Rare specimens include  the northern pintail, the American bittern, the blue-winged teal, the American coot, the tufted duck, the Wilson's snipe, among others.

Gallery

References

Pico Island
Stratovolcanoes of Portugal
Ramsar sites in Portugal